"King's Dead" is a song by American rappers Jay Rock, Kendrick Lamar, and Future with English singer James Blake, from the soundtrack album of the Marvel Studios superhero film Black Panther and Jay Rock's third studio album Redemption.

It was released by Top Dawg Entertainment, Aftermath Entertainment and Interscope Records on January 11, 2018 as both the soundtrack's second single and as the lead single from Redemption. The song is Jay Rock's first single to chart on the Billboard Hot 100. The song, along with "Bubblin" by Anderson .Paak, won Best Rap Performance, and was nominated for Best Rap Song at the 61st Annual Grammy Awards.

Reception
Briana Younger of Pitchfork gave the song a positive review, calling the song "fun and swaggering".

Music video
The music video for the song was released to Rock's Vevo channel on YouTube on February 15, 2018. It was directed by Dave Free and Jack Begert.

Remixes
On March 8, 2018, American rappers Joey Badass and XXXTentacion released a remix of the song.

Personnel
Credits adapted from digital booklet.

Performers
 Jay Rock – vocals
 Kendrick Lamar – vocals
 Future – vocals
 James Blake – vocals

Technical
 Matt Schaeffer – record engineering, mix engineering
 Mike Bozzi – master engineering
 Eric Manco – record engineering

Production
 Kendrick Lamar – production
 Teddy Walton – production
 Sounwave – additional production
 30 Roc – uncredited co-production
  – uncredited co-production

Charts

Weekly charts

Year-end charts

Certifications

Release history

Notes
  signifies an uncredited co-producer

References

External links
 

2018 songs
2018 singles
Black Panther (film series)
Future (rapper) songs
Grammy Award for Best Rap Performance
Internet memes introduced in 2018
James Blake (musician) songs
Jay Rock songs
Kendrick Lamar songs
Marvel Cinematic Universe songs
Songs written by Kendrick Lamar
Songs written by Future (rapper)
Songs written by 30 Roc
Songs written by Jay Rock
Songs written by Mike Will Made It
Songs written by Sounwave
Songs written by James Blake (musician)
Music videos directed by Dave Free
Alternative hip hop songs
Song recordings produced by Mike Will Made It
Aftermath Entertainment singles
Interscope Records singles
Top Dawg Entertainment singles